The 2019 Oregon Ducks football team represented the University of Oregon during the 2019 NCAA Division I FBS football season. The team was led by second-year head coach Mario Cristobal. Oregon played their home games at Autzen Stadium in Eugene, Oregon. The Ducks competed as members of the North Division of the Pac-12 Conference.

Oregon started the year with a neutral-site game against Auburn in Arlington, Texas, where they lost, 27–21. The Ducks won their next nine games before being upset on the road by Arizona State, effectively knocking them out of contention for the College Football Playoff. With a regular season record of 10–2 (8–1 in Pac-12 play), Oregon represented the North Division in the Pac-12 Championship Game, where they defeated South Division champion and fifth-ranked Utah, 37–15, to win their first conference title since 2014. They received an invitation to the Rose Bowl, where they defeated Big Ten Conference runner-up Wisconsin, 28–27. Oregon was ranked fifth in the season's final AP Poll.

Oregon's offense was led by senior quarterback Justin Herbert, who passed for 3,471 yards and 34 touchdowns. Running back C. J. Verdell led the team in rushing with 1,220 yards and eight touchdowns. Offensive tackle Penei Sewell was a unanimous All-American and was the recipient of the Outland Trophy as the nation's best lineman on either side of the ball. Defensively, the team's leading tackler was linebacker Troy Dye, who was named second-team all-conference.

Preseason

Award watch lists
Listed in the order that they were released

Pac-12 media day

Pac-12 media poll
In the Pac-12 preseason media poll, Oregon was voted as the favorite to win North Division, finishing one vote ahead of defending conference champion Washington. The Ducks received the second-most votes to win the Pac-12 Championship Game behind Utah.

Schedule

Rankings

Personnel

Roster

Depth chart

Game summaries

vs. Auburn

In Oregon's opening game, the Ducks squared off with the SEC's Auburn Tigers at AT&T Stadium in Arlington. The Ducks leaped out to a 21–6 lead but would give up the game's last 21 points, including a late TD strike from Bo Nix to Seth Williams with nine seconds remaining in the game to fall 27–21. Justin Herbert's two touchdown passes and C. J. Verdell's TD run in the first half would not be enough for the Ducks as they fell to 0–1 to begin the season.

Nevada

Montana

at Stanford

The Ducks kicked off Pac-12 play by beating Stanford 21-6 in Palo Alto. Justin Herbert tossed three touchdown passes, two of them to Jacob Breeland, and the Ducks defense kept Stanford to just 120 yards passing to win their first conference game of the season

California

Despite a slow start at home, the Ducks scored 17 points in the second half to get the win over California. Freshman defensive lineman Kayvon Thibodeaux had two sacks for Oregon's defense and the Ducks ran for almost 200 yards against the Golden Bears.

Colorado

On Friday night at Autzen Stadium, the Ducks clobbered Colorado 45–3 to maintain control of the Pac-12 North. Oregon's running game accounted for 271 yards of offense, including four of their six touchdowns. Cyrus Habibi-Likio had three of the four rushing touchdowns. The Ducks defense also forced four turnovers in the win.

at Washington

With the Pac-12 North lead at stake, the Ducks traveled to Seattle to square off with arch-rival Washington. The game started as a back and forth battle, with both teams trading touchdowns in the first half. Washington built a 28–14 lead in the 3rd quarter thanks to three touchdown passes by Jacob Eason. Down a few scores late in the 3rd, the Ducks got a touchdown from Cyrus Habibi-Likio to cut the deficit to seven. After a Washington field goal, the Ducks responded with a 4th-down TD pass from Herbert to Mycah Pittman to end the 3rd Quarter that would cut Washington's lead to three. Midway through the 4th Quarter, still down by a field goal, the Ducks went to the ground attack to get close enough for Justin Herbert's five-yard TD strike to Jaylon Redd to give the Ducks the lead. Washington wouldn't bow down as they sustained a good drive late in the 4th, but an incomplete pass on 4th and 3 with a minute to go gave Oregon the win. The Ducks would take a three game lead in the Pac-12 North with only five games to go.

Washington State

In another revenge game from last season, the Ducks defeated Washington State 37–35 at Autzen Stadium. It was an epic back-and-forth battle with both teams trading scores. But C. J. Verdell accounted for over 250 yards of offense and freshman kicker Camden Lewis nailed a last second field goal to give the Ducks the win at home, their first over the Cougars since 2014.

at USC

Many believed this matchup to be Oregon's final test before reaching the College Football Playoff as the Ducks visited the USC Trojans. While USC was 5-3, they hadn't lost a home game all season — including an upset win over #10 Utah in Week 4. In a high-scoring game, Juwan Johnson scored three 3rd Quarter touchdowns and Oregon's defense frustrated the USC offense by getting sacks and turnovers en route to a 56–24 victory at the LA Coliseum. The Ducks fell in an early 10–0 hole, but held the Trojans to 14 points the rest of the game and scored touchdowns on defense and special teams to pick up the win.

Arizona

The Ducks dominated from start to finish and defeated Arizona 34–6 in another revenge game from last season. Herbert tossed four more touchdown passes in the victory. In addition to the win, the Ducks locked up the Pac-12 North division and clinched a spot in the Pac-12 Championship for the first time since 2014.

at Arizona State

On a Saturday night in the desert, the Ducks struggled to stop Jayden Daniels and his group of wide receivers throughout the game. Oregon trailed Arizona State 24–7 in the 4th Quarter, but Herbert and Johnny Johnson III hooked up twice for touchdowns to pull Oregon within three. But on the next possession for the Sun Devils, Daniels hit Brandon Aiyuk on 3rd and 16 for an 84-yard touchdown to seal the deal late in the 4th quarter. The Ducks would get one more touchdown from Johnson but it would not be enough as they suffered a 31–28 loss in Tempe. It would eventually knock out any chance Oregon would have to make it to the College Football Playoff.

Oregon State

In the latest edition of the Civil War rivalry, the Ducks' special teams came to life with a Mykael Wright 94-yard kick return TD in the 1st half. The Ducks defense kept a hot Oregon State out of the end zone en route to a 24–10 win. The Ducks ended the regular season 10–2 and earned a spot in the Pac-12 title game.

vs. Utah (Pac-12 Championship Game)

Oregon squared off with the Utah Utes, the Pac-12 South champions, in the Pac-12 Championship. Oregon would head to the Rose Bowl with a win, while Utah, ranked number 5 at the time, was playing for a spot in the College Football Playoff. Oregon started off fast, stopping Utah on two 4th and 1's, forcing an interception, and scoring 20 points in the 1st half. C. J. Verdell scored on Oregon's first drive while Herbert hit Johnny Johnson III for a 49 yard TD strike in the 2nd quarter. Utah would respond in the 2nd half. After Oregon failed to score on their first drive of the half, the Utes would get on the board with a rushing TD from Zack Moss. Following a field goal by Camden Lewis, the Utes would get a touchdown and two-point conversion from Samson Nacua to make it 23–15 Oregon. The Ducks would put the game away midway through the 4th quarter when Verdell rushed for a 70-yard touchdown to give Oregon a 15-point lead late in the game. Utah attempted a comeback, but Tyler Huntley was picked off by Troy Dye with three minutes to play in the game. The Ducks would capitalize two plays later with another touchdown run by Verdell from 31 yards out, making it 37–15 Oregon and sealing the victory. The Ducks headed into the postseason at 11–2 and secured a spot in the Rose Bowl. The loss ended Utah's bid for a College Football Playoff spot.

vs. Wisconsin (2020 Rose Bowl Game)

The Ducks would meet the Big Ten runner-up, the 10–3 Wisconsin Badgers, in the Rose Bowl in Pasadena for a rematch of the 2012 Rose Bowl. The game started out well for Oregon as they scored a touchdown on their opening possession from Justin Herbert on a QB run. The Badgers would return the ensuing kickoff for a touchdown to tie it up. After Wisconsin kicked a field goal to make it 10–7, Herbert ran for his second score of the game to give Oregon the lead, 14–10. Wisconsin would respond as Jack Coan found Quintez Cephus for a short touchdown to give Wisconsin a 17–14 lead at halftime. Wisconsin did not get much going on their first drive of the 3rd quarter, leading to a punt. But Oregon's special teams managed to block the punt and Brady Breeze took the blocked punt to the end zone to put Oregon up 21–17. Wisconsin's defense held off the Ducks offense and put up the next 10 points to go up 27–21 in the 4th quarter. But during a possession late in the game, Wisconsin RB Jonathan Taylor fumbled the football, which was recovered by Oregon. On the next play, Herbert would keep it himself for a 30-yard touchdown run, his third of the game, to put the Ducks up 28–27. The Ducks defense would stop the Badgers on their final two possessions and Oregon ran out the clock to secure the win. The Ducks won their first Rose Bowl since 2014 and finished the season 12–2 and Rose Bowl Champions.

Players drafted into the NFL

References

Oregon
Oregon Ducks football seasons
Pac-12 Conference football champion seasons
Rose Bowl champion seasons
Oregon Ducks football